Pavlos Mitropoulos (born 4 April 1990) is a Greek professional footballer who plays as a defensive midfielder for Gamma Ethniki club PAO Rouf.

Career
During the 2012/13 season, Pavlos Mitropoulos felt he was receiving recognition as AEK Athens had signed him just four months ago and from the very beginning start to gather compliments. Ewald Lienen had an asset, his teammates called him "pit bull", the club was looking to see how it will give €200.000 to Panetolikos to buy him in the summer and the journalists praised by comparing him with Akis Zikos. The 23-year-old midfielder added in the equation players who admires like Kostas Katsouranis, Ieroklis Stoltidis and Claude Makélélé, while he had the feeling that he was unstoppable. It seemed obvious that his career had taken off!

On 19 April 2013, a Super League disciplinary committee voted to dock AEK three points and award Panthrakikos a 3–0 win, after fans stormed the pitch and chased players from the field during the AEK-Panthrakikos match on 14 April 2013. As a result, AEK were relegated from the Super League to the Football League for the first time in their history. In addition, AEK will start their Football League campaign on minus 2 points. Mitropoulos did not manage to reverse this bad climate from him as most of the fans believed that his third relegation in a row (AEK after Olympiakos Volou and Panetolikos) was an indication of the hoodoo.

On 7 July 2013 Mitropoulos signed to Panionios as a transfer from Panetolikos. He made his debut with the club on 18 August, in a 0-0 away draw against OFI, and scored his first goal in March 2014 in a victorious 4-2 home win against Levadiakos.
On 13 May 2014, it was announced that Mitropoulos signed a new three-year contract for Panionios, that keep him in the club until 2017, having agreed with the club since January of the same year.

On 5 March 2016, he signed with Swedish Division 1 club Akropolis on a year contract for an undisclosed fee. Prior to his transfer, he made a contact with Italian Serie B club Ternana Calcio without reached an agreement. On 22 November 2016, almost one-and-a-half month before the January transfer window Mitropoulos signed a contract with OFI till the end of the 2016-17 season, with a renewal clause for an additional year in the club managed to promote in the Super League Greece.
On 10 May 2017, he solved his contract with the club. and after two months he signed a two year-contract with Super League Greece club, Levadiakos for an undisclosed fee.

References

External links
Profile at EPAE.org

First sign for AEK

1990 births
Living people
Greek footballers
Olympiacos Volos F.C. players
Panetolikos F.C. players
AEK Athens F.C. players
Panionios F.C. players
Levadiakos F.C. players
Panegialios F.C. players
Association football midfielders
Footballers from Aigio